Teddy Sadaoui (born 18 April 1983, in France) is a French professional rugby league footballer who plays for AS Carcassonne in the French Rugby League Championship. A France international representative centre, he previously played for Catalans Dragons of Super League and was released at the end of 2006's Super League XI.

He was named in the France squad for the 2008 Rugby League World Cup.

He was also named in the French national squad for the 2009 Four Nations. He played again for France in the 2010 European Cup.

References

1983 births
Living people
AS Carcassonne players
Catalans Dragons players
France national rugby league team players
French rugby league players
People from Carcassonne
Rugby league centres
Sportspeople from Aude